Diederick Luigi Luydens (born 18 February 1999) is a footballer who plays as a defender for Vierde Divisie team SC Feyenoord. Born in the Netherlands, he plays for the Aruba national team.

Club career
Luydens started his youth career with DWO Zoetermeer, where he was scouted by Ajax and Sparta Rotterdam. Even though he did trials at Ajax with Matthijs de Ligt and Justin Kluivert, he chose to join Sparta. He played 56 matches for Jong Sparta in Tweede Divisie, before his contract with the club expired in June 2019.

In November 2019, Luydens joined Alphense Boys after spending few months as a free agent. In February 2020, he moved to Swedish fourth division club Åtvidabergs FF.

International career
Born in the Netherlands, Luydens represent Aruba at international level. He was part of under-20 team at 2018 CONCACAF U-20 Championship. He made his senior team debut on 3 June 2021 in a 3–1 win against Cayman Islands.

Career statistics

International

References

External links
 

1999 births
Living people
Association football defenders
Aruban footballers
Aruba international footballers
Dutch footballers
Dutch people of Aruban descent
Tweede Divisie players
Sparta Rotterdam players
Alphense Boys players
Expatriate footballers in Sweden